Sven Aage Hauge (29 December 1923 – 31 May 1997) was a Norwegian military officer, a General of the Royal Norwegian Air Force. He served as Chief of Defence of Norway from 1982 to 1984.

He was trained and graduated as a fighter pilot in Little Norway during World War II in Canada in 1944, and later he also graduated as a naval officer.

He was decorated as a Commander with Star of the Order of St. Olav in 1982.

References

1923 births
1997 deaths
Royal Norwegian Air Force generals
Chiefs of Defence (Norway)